The Cronulla Sutherland Water Polo Club is an Australian club water polo team that competes in the Australian Water Polo League.  They have senior men's and women's teams as well as multiple junior teams and are based in Cronulla, New South Wales.

Men's Honours

National titles
Australian Water Polo League
 Champions (5): 1994, 1995, 1996, 1997 and 1999
 Runners up (4): 1991, 1992, 1993 and 2000
 Bronze Medallist (3): 1998, 2017, 2018
 Semi-Finalist (1): 2002
 Elimination Finalist (6): 2001, 2003, 2004, 2005 and 2016, 2022

Women's Honours

National titles
Australian Water Polo League
 Champions (2): 2006 and 2012
 Runners up (2): 2011, 2022
 Bronze Medallist (1): 2016
 Semi-FInalist (1): 2015
 Elimination Finalist (7): 2004, 2005, 2009, 2010, 2017, 2018 and 2019

2023 AWL Squads

Notable players

References

External links
 

Water polo clubs in Australia
Sporting clubs in Sydney
Sports clubs established in 1963
1963 establishments in Australia
Cronulla, New South Wales